Veritas Academy is a private classical Christian university-model school located in southwest Austin, Texas. "It is a private, classical, college prep school that seeks to train hearts and minds for the glory of God through rigorous curricula, character education, competitive athletics, fine & performing arts, and an array of extra‐ and co-curricular activities.", offering primary and secondary education in grades  PreSchool-12. Up until 9th grade, students are partially home schooled with parents acting as "co-teachers" that assist with teaching and assessing students. Students in PreSchool-4th grade are in the "Grammar School" where they are taught to memorize facts. Students in GS only attend school on Monday and Wednesday and are home schooled on Tuesday and Thursday. Students in 5th-8th grade are in the "School of Logic" where they are taught to apply those facts. SL students attend school Monday, Wednesday, and Friday except for 8th graders who attend half days on Tuesday and Thursday. Finally, students in 9th-12th grade are in the "School of Rhetoric" where they are taught to develop and build upon existing logic and grammar. To the distraught of many OCD people, SR students are required to take a logic class, instead of taking a logic class in SL.

Veritas Academy operated on the property of Austin Oaks Church until 2018, when it moved to a new, permanent campus on Escarpment Boulevard. Since the new property is located on the Edward's Aquifer, only 39 acres can be developed.

References

Veritas History

External links

 Veritas Academy

Christian schools in Texas
Schools in Travis County, Texas
Education in Austin, Texas
Educational institutions established in 2005
Private high schools in Texas
2005 establishments in Texas